Barton Town Football Club was a football club based in Barton-upon-Humber, Lincolnshire, England. The club was formed in 1880 and merged with Barton Old Boys F.C. in 1995 to form Barton Town Old Boys F.C.

History
Barton Town was formed in 1880, moving to the Marsh Lane ground in 1927. Town was one of the founder members of the Lincolnshire League, winning it in 1960/61, before embarking on its golden era over the following two decades, initially in the Midland League and then, particularly, in the Yorkshire League. The club returned to the Lincolnshire League in the early 1980s, winning the first division title in 1981/82. The Swans  remained in the league for the next 10 years before dropping out for the usual off-field reasons, lack of help and finance. They merged with Barton Old Boys F.C. in 1995 to form Barton Town Old Boys F.C.

Honours
Yorkshire Football League Division Two
Promoted: 1964–65, 1971–72 (as champions), 1979–80 (as champions)

Records
FA Cup
Third Qualifying Round 1967–68, 1980–81
FA Trophy
Third Qualifying Round 1971–72, 1972–73
FA Vase
Fourth Round 1979–80

See also
Barton Town F.C. players

References

Defunct football clubs in England
Defunct football clubs in Lincolnshire
Northern Counties East Football League
Yorkshire Football League
Association football clubs established in 1880
1880 establishments in England
Midland Football League (1889)
Association football clubs disestablished in 1995
1995 disestablishments in England
Barton-upon-Humber
Lincolnshire Football League